Mackensen may refer to:

 Mackensen (Dassel), a village in Dassel, Lower Saxony, Germany
 August von Mackensen (1849-1945), German World War I field marshal
 Two of his sons:
 Eberhard von Mackensen (1889-1969), German World War II general
 Hans Georg von Mackensen (1883-1947), German diplomat
 Fritz Mackensen (1866-1953), German painter
 Isabel Mackensen-Geis (born 1986), German politician
 , German World War I class of ships
 , the lead ship of the Mackensen class of battlecruisers